Batyle is a genus of beetles in the family Cerambycidae, containing the following species:

 Batyle ignicollis (Say, 1824)
 Batyle knowltoni Knull, 1968
 Batyle laevicollis Bates, 1892
 Batyle rufiventris Knull, 1928
 Batyle suturalis (Say, 1824)

References

Trachyderini
Cerambycidae genera